King of the Ring is a WWE professional wrestling pay-per-view

King of the Ring may also refer to:
King of the Ring tournament, the professional wrestling tournament itself for which the pay-per-view was named after
WWF King of the Ring (video game)
Ring Ka King, India professional wrestling tournament
King and Queen of the Ring (2023), a wrestling event hosted by WWE
King in the Ring, New Zealand professional kick-boxing tournament
King of the Ring, a title for a car with the fastest lap time on the Nürburgring Nordschleife